Middle Island is a bar island on the Ohio River at St. Marys in Pleasants County, West Virginia, USA.

Middle Island lends its name to West Virginia's Middle Island Creek and lies at its confluence with "The Thoroughfare", a channel of the Ohio River that separates the island from the riverbank. A bridge (currently being renovated in 2019) connects Middle Island to downtown St. Marys. Middle Island is protected as part of the Ohio River Islands National Wildlife Refuge.

See also 
List of islands of West Virginia

References

River islands of West Virginia
Islands of Pleasants County, West Virginia
Islands of the Ohio River